Patrick McCabe or Pat McCabe may refer to:
 Patrick E. McCabe (1860–1931), clerk of the New York State Senate
 Patrick McCabe (Irish republican) (1916–1971), member of the Irish Republican Army
 Patrick McCabe (novelist) (born 1955), Irish novelist
 Pat McCabe (lacrosse) (born 1969), American lacrosse player
 Pat McCabe (rugby union) (born 1988), Australian rugby union player